Medicine at Midnight is the tenth studio album by American rock band Foo Fighters. It was released through RCA and Roswell Records on February 5, 2021, after having its release be pushed out of 2020 due to the COVID-19 pandemic. Produced by Greg Kurstin and the band, the album shows a slight shift in the band's style, pairing their usual rock sound with elements of dance-rock and pop. It is the final Foo Fighters studio album to feature drummer Taylor Hawkins before his death the following year.

Three singles were released for the album: "Shame Shame" in November 2020, "No Son of Mine" on New Year's Day 2021, and "Waiting on a War" in January 2021. The album received generally positive reviews from critics.

Background and recording
After releasing their ninth studio album, Concrete and Gold in 2017, and touring extensively behind it through much of 2018, the Foo Fighters announced they would be taking a break in October 2018, with frontman Dave Grohl stating that although they needed a rest, he already had some initial ideas for the band's next album. The break would last for less than a year, as by August 2019, drummer Taylor Hawkins reported that Grohl had already been demoing material by himself, and that the rest of the members planned to start contributing shortly thereafter. The band collectively started recording for the album in October 2019. The following month, Grohl described the band as being "right in the middle" of the recording process, and that the album was sounding "fucking weird".

The album was recorded in a large, old house from the 1940s in Encino, Los Angeles. Recording sessions proceeded quickly, something Grohl attributed two things – that the material was progressing quickly and that they were recording in an environment where strange things kept happening. Grohl recalled:

Grohl noted that they captured unexplainable footage on video, but due to a non-disclosure agreement with the house's owner, who was attempting to sell the property, the footage cannot be shown. Contrary to the Concrete and Gold sessions, which frequently ended in nights of large cookouts, drinking, and parties, the sessions were wrapped up as quickly as possible. In February 2020, Grohl confirmed that the album was finished.

Composition and themes
Writers described the album's sound as alternative rock, hard rock, pop rock, power pop, and dance-rock. Grohl likened the album's sound to David Bowie's Let's Dance album, with him explaining that it's "not like a EDM, disco, [or] modern dance record" but rather "this really up, fun record" that is "filled with anthemic, huge, sing-along rock songs." Hawkins described the album as being more "pop-oriented" than prior releases, different from their usual post-grunge sound. He also noted the use of a drum loop on the album, another atypical trait for the band. The song "Cloudspotter" contains a guitar riff that Grohl wrote 25 years earlier in Seattle but was unable to work into a song previously. Grohl stated, "Some of those songs, the best ones happen in 45 minutes. Then there's other songs — there's a riff on the new record I’ve been working on for 25 years. The first time I demoed it was in my basement in Seattle." Grohl stated that the album's overall style was inspired by the Foo Fighters' "love of rock bands that make these upbeat, up-tempo, almost danceable records".

Release and promotion
In February 2020, the band announced "The Van Tour 2020", a 25th-anniversary tour where the band would perform in all of the same cities as the band had twenty-five years prior in their first North American tour, only in larger venues. While the tour was originally scheduled to run in April and May 2020, the COVID-19 pandemic forced the band to delay the tour to October and December of the same year. In May 2020, the band announced that they had indefinitely delayed the album, while the band figures out how to promote and sell the album post-pandemic. While the initial delay was due to the pandemic and the band's inability to tour in support of it, Grohl later decided to release it during the pandemic anyhow, upon realizing its ability to be heard and lift people's spirits outweighed their desire to tour in support of it. Anticipation remained high for the album; Kerrang! placed the album atop of their "15 Albums Still to Look Forward to in 2020" list.

Promotions picked back up again in November of the same year. The band announced they would perform on the November 7 episode of Saturday Night Live. Treading up to the performance, they started teasing new music snippets of a song on their social media platforms. On November 7, the band released the first single, "Shame Shame". On January 1, 2021, the band released the second single of the album, "No Son of Mine". On January 14, the band released the third single, "Waiting on a War".

In the United States, Medicine at Midnight debuted at number three on the Billboard 200 album chart which was earned by 70,000 equivalent album units, 64,000 of which were album sales, making it the top-selling album of the week.

Critical reception

Medicine at Midnight received generally positive reviews from music critics. At Metacritic, which assigns a normalized rating out of 100 to reviews from professional publications, the release received an average score of 75, based on 22 reviews, indicating "generally favorable reviews". Stephen Thomas Erlewine of AllMusic praised Medicine at Midnight as "a speedy, hooky, and efficient record, every bit the party album Grohl promised." Rolling Stones Kory Grow described the music as the band's "most upbeat" to date. James McMahon of NME gave further praise to the music, considering it a welcome addition to the band's catalog. He further named "Love Dies Young" as one of the band's best songs up to that point.

Other reviewers expressed more mixed assessments. The Guardians Alexis Petridis found a lack of innovative music compared to its predecessors, stating that the new musical elements are "gentle nods towards an idea, scattered sparingly around an album that otherwise sounds exactly like Foo Fighters." He ultimately deduced the record as "a solid but unspectacular album" but nonetheless successful. Alexandra Pollard of The Independent also found the music lacking in innovation, calling it "a perfectly perfunctory addition to a canon of robust rock'n'roll". She felt that the album would satisfy the band's longtime fans and make welcome addition to their concert setlists. More negatively, Pitchforks Jeremy D. Larson criticized Medicine at Midnight as "another album of inconsequential music", further noting that it "adds very little to [the band's] extensive catalog of interchangeable power pop and hard-rock sing-alongs".

It was elected by Loudwire as the 31st best rock/metal album of 2021.

Commercial performance
In the United States, Medicine at Midnight debuted at number three on the Billboard 200 chart with 70,000 album-equivalent units, which consisted 64,000 pure album copies.  In United Kingdom, Medicine at Midnight debuted at number one on the UK Albums chart with 42,500 album-equivalent units sold.

Track listing

Personnel
Credits adapted from Tidal.

Foo Fighters
 Dave Grohl – lead vocals, guitar, producer
 Pat Smear – guitar, producer
 Chris Shiflett – guitar, producer
 Nate Mendel – bass guitar, producer
 Taylor Hawkins – drums, producer
 Rami Jaffee – keyboards, piano, producer

Additional musicians

 Samantha Sidley – background vocals
 Violet Grohl – background vocals
 Barbara Gruska – background vocals
 Laura Mace – background vocals
 Inara George – background vocals
 Omar Hakim – percussion
 Jacob Braun – cello 
 Greg Kurstin – strings 
 Alma Fernandez – viola 
 Charlie Bisharat – violin 
 Songa Lee – violin 

Technical

 Greg Kurstin – producer
 Randy Merrill – mastering engineer
 Mark "Spike" Stent – mixing engineer
 Darrell Thorp – engineer
 Matt Wolach – assistant engineer
 Alex Pasco – assistant engineer

Charts

Weekly charts

Year-end charts

Certifications

See also
Studio 666

Notes

References

External links

2021 albums
Albums postponed due to the COVID-19 pandemic
Albums produced by Greg Kurstin
Dance-rock albums
Foo Fighters albums
Grammy Award for Best Rock Album
Power pop albums by American artists
Roswell Records albums